The 2006–07 Indiana Hoosiers men's basketball team represented Indiana University in the 2006–07 college basketball season. Their head coach was Kelvin Sampson, in his first season with the Hoosiers. Sampson, formerly at Oklahoma was hired on March 29, 2006 to replace the recently resigned Mike Davis. The team played its home games at Assembly Hall in Bloomington, Indiana, and was a member of the Big Ten Conference.
The Hoosiers finished the season with an overall record 21–11 and a conference record of 10–6, placing them 3rd in the Big Ten Conference. Indiana lost the only Big Ten tournament game in which they played, an overtime loss to Illinois. As a 7-seed in the NCAA tournament, Indiana beat 10-seed Gonzaga to advance to the second round. They would fall to 2-seed UCLA to end the season.

2006–07 Roster

Recruiting class

Schedule and results

|-
!colspan=9| Regular Season
|-

|-
!colspan=9| Big Ten tournament

|-
!colspan=9| NCAA tournament

|-

References

Indiana Hoosiers
Indiana Hoosiers men's basketball seasons
Indiana
2006 in sports in Indiana
2007 in sports in Indiana